Jo Daviess County is the northwesternmost county in the U.S. state of Illinois. According to the 2010 census, it had a population of 22,678. Its county seat is Galena.

Jo Daviess County is part of the Tri-State Area and is located near Dubuque, Iowa and Platteville, Wisconsin. As part of the Driftless Area, Jo Daviess County is known for its scenic stretches of road, high hills and valley views. Within Jo Daviess County lies Charles Mound, the highest natural point in Illinois, as well as eight of the ten highest points in Illinois.

History

Jo Daviess County was formed in 1827 out of Henry and Putnam Counties. It is named for Maj. Joseph Hamilton Daveiss, United States District Attorney for Kentucky, who was killed in 1811 at the Battle of Tippecanoe. The local pronunciation is "Davis".  Jo Daviess County was founded exclusively by immigrants from New England.  These were old stock "Yankee" immigrants, meaning they were descended from the English Puritans who settled New England in the 1600s.  The completion of the Erie Canal caused a surge in New England immigration to what was then the Northwest Territory. 

The end of the Black Hawk War led to an additional surge of immigration, once again coming almost exclusively from the six New England states as a result of overpopulation combined with land shortages in that region. Some of these later settlers were from upstate New York and had parents who had moved to that region from New England shortly after the Revolutionary War. New Englanders and New England transplants from upstate New York were the vast majority of Jo Daviess County's inhabitants during the first several decades of its history. These settlers were primarily members of the Congregational Church though due to the Second Great Awakening many of them had converted to Methodism and some had become Baptists before coming to what is now Jo Daviess County.  The Congregational Church subsequently has gone through many divisions and some factions, including those in Jo Daviess County are now known as the Church of Christ and the United Church of Christ.  

As a result of this heritage the vast majority of inhabitants in Jo Daviess County, much like antebellum New England were overwhelmingly in favor of the abolitionist movement during the decades leading up to the Civil War.  

In the late 1880s and early 1890s Irish and German migrants began moving into Jo Daviess County, most of these later immigrants did not move directly from Ireland and Germany, but rather from other areas in the Midwest where they had been living, particularly the state of Ohio.

County border changes
 1830- The northern border of Illinois and Wisconsin was formally established. Until that time, several Wisconsin towns actually were under the jurisdiction of Jo Daviess County.
 1831- Rock Island County was formed from a part of the county, along with a new northern extension of Henry County and Putnam County.
 1836- Whiteside, Ogle, and Winnebago counties were formed from the southern and eastern sections of the county.
 1837- Stephenson County was formed from the eastern section of the county.
 1839- Carroll County was formed from the southern section of the county.

Geography

Climate and weather

Major highways
In Illinois, US 20 is designated the General Ulysses S. Grant Highway (often abbreviated the U.S. Grant Memorial Highway) and is the longest route in the United States.
In eastern Jo Daviess County US 20 is one of the few areas that remain two-lane across the entire stretch of US 20.
The road between Dubuque and Stockton was once known as the most dangerous stretch of road because of the hills and curves flanked by cliffs and valleys. Travelers were greeted with signs reminding them to drive carefully as they entered this stretch of road.
  U.S. Route 20
  Illinois Route 35
  Illinois Route 78
  Illinois Route 84

Adjacent counties

 Lafayette County, Wisconsin - north
 Stephenson County - east
 Carroll County - south
 Jackson County, Iowa - southwest
 Dubuque County, Iowa - west
 Grant County, Wisconsin - northwest

National protected area
 Upper Mississippi River National Wildlife and Fish Refuge (part)

State protected area
 Apple River Canyon State Park

Locally protected area
Several areas are protected by the charitable organization Jo Daviess Conservation Foundation:
 Buehler Preserve
 Casper Bluff Land & Water Reserve
 Horseshoe Mound
 Schurmeier Teaching Forest
 Valley of Eden Bird Sanctuary
 Wapello Land & Water Reserve

Demographics

As of the 2010 United States Census, there were 22,678 people, 9,753 households, and 6,514 families residing in the county. The racial makeup of the county was 97.2% white, 0.5% black or African American, 0.3% Asian, 0.2% American Indian, 0.9% from other races, and 0.9% from two or more races. Those of Hispanic or Latino origin made up 2.7% of the population. In terms of ancestry, 49.4% were German, 19.7% were Irish, 11.1% were English, and 8.5% were American.

Of the 9,753 households, 25.3% had children under the age of 18 living with them, 55.9% were married couples living together, 7.0% had a female householder with no husband present, 33.2% were non-families, and 28.4% of all households were made up of individuals. The average household size was 2.31 and the average family size was 2.81. The median age was 47.1 years.

The median income for a household in the county was $50,279 and the median income for a family was $60,381. Males had a median income of $38,372 versus $29,412 for females. The per capita income for the county was $26,819. About 5.6% of families and 8.4% of the population were below the poverty line, including 11.5% of those under age 18 and 6.4% of those age 65 or over.

Communities

Cities
 East Dubuque
 Galena (county seat)

Villages

 Apple River
 Elizabeth
 Hanover
 Menominee
 Nora
 Scales Mound
 Stockton
 Warren

Census-designated places
 Apple Canyon Lake
 The Galena Territory

Townships
Jo Daviess County is divided into twenty-three townships:

 Apple River
 Berreman
 Council Hill
 Derinda
 Dunleith
 East Galena
 Elizabeth
 Guilford
 Hanover
 Menominee
 Nora
 Pleasant Valley
 Rawlins
 Rice
 Rush
 Scales Mound
 Stockton
 Thompson
 Vinegar Hill
 Wards Grove
 Warren
 West Galena
 Woodbine

Unincorporated communities

 Aiken
 Blanding
 Bremen
 Council Hill
 Elmoville
 Guilford
 Massbach
 Morseville
 Pleasant Valley
 Rice
 Rodden
 Schapville
 Whitton
 Willow
 Woodbine

Historic site
 Apple River Fort

Government and politics
Jo Daviess County has a fairly typical Yankee Northern Illinois political history, although it has generally voted more Democratic than nearby rural counties. It voted Democratic only four times between 1856 and 1992: for Grover Cleveland in 1892, Woodrow Wilson in 1912, Franklin D. Roosevelt in 1932, and Lyndon B. Johnson in 1964. Between 1996 and 2016 Jo Daviess was a swing county, voting for the national winner each time. The 2020 results were: Donald Trump, 7,166 (57.3%), Joe Biden 5,109 (40.9%); Jo Jorgensen, 125 (1%), others 96 (0.8%).

Political culture

Councillors
 Ron Smith (R), District 9 (Council Hill & East Galena), Chairman
 Brandon Behlke (R), District 11 (West Galena II & Rawlins)
 Gerald Bennett (D), District 6 (Apple River & Warren I)
 Merri Belage (R), District 13 (Elizabeth & Rice), Vice-Chair
 Bill Bingham (R), District 4 (Vinegar Hill & Menominee)
 Jody Covert (R), District 14 (Hanover & Rice)
 Rick Dittmar (R), District 15 (Berreman, Derinda, Pleasant Valley, & Woodbine)
 Robert Heuerman (R), District 16 (Stockton I & Wards Grove)
 Dan Hughes (R), District 7 (Nora, Warren II, & Rush)
 Randy Jobgen (D), District 10 (West Galena I)
 Steve McIntyre (R), District 8 (Thompson & Guilford)
 Margie Montelius (D), District 1 (Dunlieth I)
 John O'Boyle (R), District 17 (Stockton II & Rush)
 Steve Rutz (R), District 3 (Dunlieth III)
 Terry Stoffregen (R), District 12 (West Galena III & Rawlins)
 R.J. Winkelhake (R), District 5 (Scales Mound & Guilford)
 Don Zillig (D), District 2 (Dunlieth II)

See also
 National Register of Historic Places listings in Jo Daviess County, Illinois
 Stagecoach Trail

References

External links
 Jo Daviess County, IL official website
 Galena/Jo Daviess County Convention & Visitors Bureau
 Who was Jo Daviess?

 
1827 establishments in Illinois
Populated places established in 1827
Driftless Area
Illinois counties
Illinois counties on the Mississippi River